The transition period of the now-defunct Autonomous Region in Muslim Mindanao (ARMM) into the Bangsamoro Autonomous Region in Muslim Mindanao (BARMM) began when the Bangsamoro Organic Law was ratified in a two-part plebiscite held in January and February 2019. It is set to end after the first set of regular officials are elected in 2025.

Background 

The BARMM was created after residents of the then-existing ARMM voted to ratify the Bangsamoro Organic Law in January 2019. Cotabato City and 67 barangays in Cotabato province also voted to join Bangsamoro in the second part of the plebiscite in February 2019.

The initial members of the Bangsamoro Transition Authority (BTA) were sworn in by President Rodrigo Duterte on February 22, 2019, and the ARMM was officially turned over to the BARMM on February 26, 2019. The BARMM was inaugurated almost a month later on March 29, 2019, when the BTA, as the interim Bangsamoro Parliament, also held its first session. The Bangsamoro transition plan was then adopted by the Bangsamoro Parliament on June 18, 2019.

The transition work was hampered by financial constraints with members of the BTA only receiving their salaries on the first week of July 2019. By that time, the BTA is still negotiating for a transition fund from the Department of Budget and Management and the slow transition work has led to President Rodrigo Duterte appointing Manny Piñol who resigned from his post as Agriculture secretary as a point man for the national government in dealing with the Bangsamoro regional government.

The impact of the COVID-19 pandemic in the region has also impacted the work for the transition period which is supposed to end on June 30, 2022. The pandemic is cited for the reason for the non-passage of a Bangsamoro Electoral Code led to lobbying by the Bangsamoro regional government and some advocacy groups for the national government to postpone the elections. The campaign was successful after President Rodrigo Duterte signed into law on October 28, 2021 the bill postponing the elections, and consequentially the end of the transition period, to 2025.

Transition plan and priority laws

During the transition period, the Bangsamoro Transition Authority as the interim parliament had obligations to complete.

Transition plan
The Bangsamoro Organic Law mandates interim Chief Minister Murad Ebrahim to submit to the BTA within the first 60 days of the transition period a transition plan containing the Bangsamoro government's "proposed organizational plan, as well as, the schedule for implementation therefor." It also requires the approval or action of the BTA on the proposed plan within 10 days upon its submission. If there is failure to act upon the plan within 10 days, the plan would be automatically approved and implemented within 15 days. According to Murad the start of the transition period for the purpose of submitting the transition plan was on March 29, or the inaugural session of the interim parliament. The plan's deadline is stated to be in May 2018.

The transition plan was then submitted to the Bangsamoro Parliament on June 17, 2019, and was approved by the legislature the following day.

Priority laws
The BTA as the interim Bangsamoro parliament is also required to pass into law "priority legislation" enumerated in the Bangsamoro Organic Law. Following the fourth session of the parliament, eight ad hoc committees were formed to draft the priority legislations. These committees were eventually dissolved and by August 2019, the interim Cabinet are working on the drafts instead. These drafts are still to be reviewed for adoption by the parliament.

The first three of the six priority codes; namely the Administrative, Civil Service, and Local Government Codes were filed before the Bangsamoro Parliament on July 22, 2020 while the Education Code was filed on October 28, 2020.

The Administrative Code was the first to be approved by the Parliament. The code as proposed under Cabinet Bill No. 60 was passed on October 28, 2020 and was signed into law by Chief Minister Murad Ebrahim on November 5, 2020. The Civil Service Code was passed by the Parliament and was signed into law on February 24, 2021. The Education Code became law on May 18, 2021. The Electoral Code became law on March 9, 2023.

Inter-governmental relations bodies
The Bangsamoro Organic Law provides for the creation of Inter-governmental relations bodies (IGR) which would facilitate inter-governmental relations between the Bangsamoro regional government and the Philippine national government. Five IGRs including the National Government-Bangsamoro Government Intergovernmental Relations Body has been constituted as of September 2020.

Reorganization of government agencies

Ministries
When the ARMM was succeeded by the Bangsamoro Autonomous Region in Muslim Mindanao (BARMM) in 2019, the regional departments of the former Autonomous Region in Muslim Mindanao were reconfigured into ministries of Bangsamoro.

Bangsamoro police

The Police Regional Office Autonomous Region in Muslim Mindanao (PRO ARMM) of the Philippine National Police (PNP) was organized sometime in 2019 as the Police Regional Office Bangsamoro Autonomous Region (PRO BAR). Since the Bangsamoro autonomous region had a slightly larger scope than its predecessor, the new police regional office had to expand its jurisdiction as well. They were previous proposals to create an independent police force for the region, but did not materialized.

By April 2019, the PRO BARMM had started its gradual takeover of additional areas. They started supervising the Cotabato City Police which is still administratively under the control of Police Regional Office 12. They also began planning on how to put the barangays in Cotabato that are part of Bangsamoro under their jurisdiction.

An agreement was signed on July 5, 2019, that would allow former fighters of the Moro Islamic Liberation Front (MILF) and Moro National Liberation Front (MNLF) rebel groups to join the PNP with age, height, and education requirements waived. However applicants through this process must attain the necessary educational requirements within 15 years after joining the police force.

The integration progress began in April 2022 when the Bangsamoro government signed an agreement with the National Police Commission (Napolcom) regarding the Special Qualifying Eligibility Examination for ex-MILF and MNLF members.

Integration of local government units

Barangays in Cotabato province

Upon the effective foundation of the new Bangsamoro autonomous region, the 63 barangays in Cotabato province which voted to become part of Bangsamoro remained part of their parent municipalities. Their residents voted for municipal officials of their parent municipalities and Cotabato provincial officials in the 2019 Philippine general election. The barangays could be reorganized into one or more municipalities or merged with any of the neighboring municipalities of Maguindanao.

These barangays were still not under the effective control of Bangsamoro as of July 2019 since they were not yet officially turned over to Bangsamoro regional government which was initially set to occur once a local government code is passed by the Bangsamoro Parliament.

With the local government code still pending, the official turnover took place on November 20, 2019. The Sangguniang Panlalawigan of Cotabato has passed a resolution concerning the transfer. Amidst budgetary concerns, the barangays were assured that they will still receive their Internal Revenue Allocation directly from the Department of Budget and Management after the transfer takes place. By March 2020, the 63 barangays were already grouped into a Special Geographic Area of the Bangsamoro region.

Cotabato City
The formal turnover of Cotabato City to the Bangsamoro regional government has met opposition from Cotabato City mayor Cynthia Guiani-Sayadi. Cotabato City voted in favor of its inclusion to the Bangsamoro region in the 2019 plebiscite but Sayadi had expressed intent to file electoral protest claiming irregularities in the conduct of the plebiscite in here city. A resident filed a protest. The Bangsamoro regional government has pushed for the formal turnover of Cotabato City to the region as soon as possible while Mayor Sayadi has formally requested President Rodrigo Duterte to defer the transfer of the city to Bangsamoro until June 30, 2022, when it is expected that the "BARMM bureaucracy would have been fully operational" or the original formal end of the transition period. Sayadi was informed that the Department of Interior and Local Government has deferred the transfer to at least December 2020.

The formal turnover of Cotabato City to the Bangsamoro regional government took place on December 15, 2020. The turnover was scheduled after President Rodrigo Duterte had decided to follow the agreement with the Bangsamoro regional government.

Shortly prior to the turnover, Cotabato City Mayor Sayadi alleged that she has received death threats which she cited as the reason her non-attendance to the turnover ceremony. One sender reportedly threatened the lives who openly rejected the integration of the city to Bangsamoro, and another warned that they would bomb the city. Bangsamoro Interior Minister and spokesperson Naguib Sinarimbo, in response under the assumption that the MILF is being alleged as behind the threats, said that the rebel group has nothing to gain from issuing threats given that Cotabato City has voted for its inclusion to the Bangsamoro region. Bangsamoro Chief Minister Murad Ebrahim has called for an investigation regarding the matter.

Decommissioning of the MILF

Under the Comprehensive Agreement on the Bangsamoro signed between the Moro Islamic Liberation Front (MILF) and the Philippine national government in 2014, the rebel group would start to decommission its forces once the Bangsamoro autonomous region is set up. The decommissioning process is to be oversaw by the Independent Decommissioning Body in coordination with the Joint Normalization Committee and the Task Force for Decommissioned Combatants. The MILF started the first phase of the process when it submitted a list of its weapons and combatants for decommissioning to the government. The list accounts for 12,000 militants or a third of the MILF's forces.

The MILF will field candidates in the 2022 local elections through its political wing, the United Bangsamoro Justice Party.

Government employees
By December 2019, about 5,000 government employees of the former Autonomous Region in Muslim Mindanao lost their jobs. Under the Bangsamoro Organic Law, workers hired on a permanent, temporary, casual or contractual basis and with appointments attested by the Civil Service Commission were entitled to certain retirement or separation benefits. Employees working in the education, health, and social welfare sectors, which are deemed as significant sectors were absorbed by the Bangsamoro government.

Timeline
January 21, 2019 – First part of the Bangsamoro autonomy plebiscite where voters voted on the ratification of the Bangsamoro Organic Law.
January 25, 2019 – The Commission on Elections announced that the Bangsamoro Organic Law is "deemed" ratified.
February 6, 2019 – Second part of the Bangsamoro autonomy plebiscite to determined potential additional areas for the then-proposed Bangsamoro autonomous region.
February 22, 2019 – First set of members of the Bangsamororo Transition Authority took oath. including first and interim Chief Minister, Murad Ebrahim.
February 26, 2019 – Official turnover of the Autonomous Region in Muslim Mindanao to the Bangsamoro Autonomous Region in Muslim Mindanao.
March 29, 2019 – Inauguration of the new Bangsamoro regional government., first ever session of the Bangsamoro Parliament. and appointment of Khalipa Usman Nando as first Wali of Bangsamoro.
June 18, 2019 – Bangsamoro transition plan approved by the Bangsamoro Parliament.
November 20, 2019 – Formal turnover of the 63 barangays in Cotabato to the Bangsamoro regional government.
December 16, 2019 – National Government-Bangsamoro Government Intergovernmental Relations Body held its first meeting.
December 15, 2020 –  Formal turnover of Cotabato City to the Bangsamoro regional government.
May 12, 2025 – First Bangsamoro Parliament election
June 30, 2025 – Last day of the Bangsamoro transition period.

Comparisons

References

Transition period
2019 in the Philippines
2020 in the Philippines
2021 in the Philippines
2022 in the Philippines
Transition period